The Constitution of the Year X was a national constitution of France adopted during the Year X (10) on 16 Thermidor (4 August) of the French Revolutionary Calendar (1802 in the Gregorian calendar). It amended the Constitution of the Year VIII, revising the Consulate to augment Napoleon Bonaparte's authority by making him First Consul for Life.

Both the Constitution of the Year X and the Constitution of the Year VIII were further amended by the Constitution of the Year XII, which established the First French Empire with Napoleon as Emperor.

Timeline of French constitutions

References

Defunct constitutions
Constitutions of France
1802 in France
1802 documents
Legal history of France
1802 in law
French Consulate